El Mehdi El Moubarik (born 22 January 2001) is a Moroccan professional football player who plays for  Al-Ain.

Club career 
El Mehdi El Moubarik made his professional debut for Fath Union Sport on the 12 January 2020, coming on as a late substitute in the Botola game against Rapide Oued Zem.

International career 
El Moubarik was on the final list to participate in the 2020 UNAF U-20 Tournament qualifying for the 2021 Africa U-20 Cup of Nations and participated in all matches. El Moubarik reached the quarter finals of the 2021 Africa U-20 Cup of Nations. He eventually was named in the best XI of the competition.

Honours 
Morocco U20
 UNAF U-20 Tournament: 2020

Individual
 Africa U-20 Cup of Nations Best XI: 2021

References

External links 

 

2001 births
Living people
Moroccan footballers
Morocco youth international footballers
Association football midfielders
Fath Union Sport players
Al Ain FC players
Botola players
UAE Pro League players
Moroccan expatriate footballers
Moroccan expatriate sportspeople in the United Arab Emirates
Expatriate footballers in the United Arab Emirates